The 1966 Open Championship was the 95th Open Championship, held 6–9 July at Muirfield Golf Links in Gullane, East Lothian, Scotland. Jack Nicklaus won the first of his three Claret Jugs, one stroke ahead of runners-up Doug Sanders and Dave Thomas. It was the sixth of eighteen major titles for Nicklaus and marked the completion of the first of his three career grand slams.

This was the first Open to be scheduled over four days, with one round each day, finishing on Saturday. Previous editions had played the third and fourth rounds on Friday. The U.S. Open changed to a four-day schedule the previous year in 1965, moving its final round from Saturday afternoon to Sunday. The Open Championship operated on a Wednesday through Saturday schedule through 1979.

It was the final Open for 1964 champion Tony Lema, who died in a plane crash two weeks later, hours after the PGA Championship.

Nicklaus has described Muirfield as "the best golf course in Britain." He later developed a championship golf course and community in Dublin, Ohio, a suburb north of his hometown of Columbus. Opened in 1974, Nicklaus named it Muirfield Village and it hosts his Memorial Tournament, a top invitational event on the PGA Tour since 1976.

Course

Source:
Lengths of the course for previous Opens (since 1950):
 1959: , par 72

Past champions in the field

Made the cut

Source:

Missed the cut

Round summaries

First round
Wednesday, 6 July 1966

Second round
Thursday, 7 July 1966

Amateurs: Shade (-1), Cole (+4), Townsend (+6), Bonallack (+7),Millensted (+12), Smith (+13), Falkenburg (+22)

Third round
Friday, 8 July 1966

Final round
Saturday, 9 July 1966

Source:
Amateurs: Shade (+9), Townsend (+11), Bonallack (+13), Cole (+14)

References

External links
Muirfield 1966 (Official site)

The Open Championship
Golf tournaments in Scotland
Open Championship
Open Championship
Open Championship